The Chrono Kristin Armstrong is a professional one-day road cycling race held annually in Idaho, United States. It is part of UCI America Tour in category 1.2.

Winners

References

UCI America Tour races
Cycle races in the United States
Sports competitions in Idaho
Recurring sporting events established in 2018
2018 establishments in the United States